Ion Zangor (5 July 1938 – 1973) was a Romanian bobsledder. He competed in the two-man and the four man events at the 1972 Winter Olympics.

References

1938 births
1973 deaths
Romanian male bobsledders
Olympic bobsledders of Romania
Bobsledders at the 1972 Winter Olympics
People from Azuga